This is a List of notable Old Girls of Abbotsleigh, they being notable former students or alumnae of the Anglican Church school, Abbotsleigh in Wahroonga, New South Wales, Australia. The alumnae may elect to join the school's alumni association, the Abbotsleigh Old Girls' Union (AOGU).

Academic 
 Kathleen McCredie – educator; former headmistress of Abbotsleigh
 Merrilee Roberts – educator, former principal of Newcastle Girls' Grammar School and Ascham School
 Elizabeth Ward – educator, former principal of the Presbyterian Ladies' College, Melbourne
 Freda Whitlam  – lay preacher of the Uniting Church; Sister of former prime minister Gough Whitlam; former principal of the Presbyterian Ladies' College, Croydon (also attended Canberra Girls' Grammar School)

Entertainment, media and the arts 
 Nicole Alexander – author
 Edwina Bartholomew – Sunrise presenter
 Rebecca Baillie – director, producer and reporter for Australian Broadcasting Corporation 
 Erica Packer – singer and model; ex-wife of James Packer
 Nell Campbell – actor; played Colombia in The Rocky Horror Picture Show
 Louise Cox  – Australian architect
 Belinda Bauer – née Taubman; actor; appeared in 17 US films; played Dr. Juliette Faxx in RoboCop 2
 Linda Cropper – actress
 Kate Dennis – Emmy-nominated director and producer
 Kate Forsyth – author
 Sarah Gardner – founder of the International Federation of Arts Councils and Culture Agencies (IFACCA)
 Phoebe Victoria Clare Hamilton – pioneering horticulturalist
Alexandra Joel – author
 Janet Laurence – Australian artist
 Belinda Luscombe – journalist, editor at large at TIME Magazine
 Belinda Murrell  – author
 Georgie Parker – actress
 Jennifer Rowe  – children's book author under pen name Emily Rodda
 Helen de Guerry Simpson – novelist (also attended Kincoppal-Rose Bay)
 Grace Cossington Smith  – artist
 Cathy Wilcox – Australian cartoonist and children's book illustrator
 Linden Wilkinson – film, television and theatre actress, and writer
 Maggie MacKellar – Australian historical author.
 Patty Huntington – Journalist, founder and publisher Frockwriter Media; fashion reporter for South China Morning Post, WWD and Australian Broadcasting Corporation

Medicine and science 
 Agnes Bennett  – pioneering medical practitioner and scientist (also attended Sydney Girls High School)
 Dorothy Rhodes Taylor  – one of the first women employed in the Department of Geography at the University of Sydney. She co-authored The Geographical Laboratory (1925)| https://www.womenaustralia.info/biogs/AWE4320b.htm
 Dee Uther – Physiotherapist; Co-Founder of Lifestart, not for profit organisation assisting families and children with special needs.
 Sally Crossing  – consumer health advocate
 Kim Taubman – Specialist Doctor, Radiology; Nuclear Medicine 
 Cindy Pan – doctor, dancer, television personality
 Karen Simmer  – current professor of Newborn Medicine at the University of Western Australia
 Mary Tindale – botanist and Australian Botanical Liaison Officer

Politics, public service and the law 
 Una Parry Boyce –  Nurse and Community worker. She was state secretary of the War Widows' Guild of Australia (New South Wales) from 1961 until 1989, becoming a life member of the War Widows' Guild in 2000.
 Meredith Burgmann – politician - Australian Labor Party; former President NSW Legislative Council
 Leela Cejnar – academic at the University of Sydney
 Pauline Griffin  – former Commissioner of the Australian Industrial Relations Commission,  chair of the National Committee on Discrimination in Employment and Occupation and former Pro-Chancellor of the Australian National University
 Gabrielle Kibble  – head of the NSW Planning Authority
 Sue Walpole – former federal Sex Discrimination Commissioner

Activism 
 Sally Begbie  – co-founder of Crossroads Foundation
 Penelope Figgis  – Australian environmentalist, activist, and political scientist
 Beatrice Miles – Bohemian rebel and political activist
 Katie Wood – lawyer, General Counsel at Amnesty International Australia

Sport 
 Denise Annetts – women's cricketer for New South Wales Breakers and Australia whose international playing career ran from 1985 until 1993.
 Phyllis Arnott – member of the Arnotts biscuit family, first Australian woman to gain a commercial pilot's licence
 Hannah Campbell-Pegg – Australian Luge Winter Olympian
 Jill Coleburn – Australian biathlete
 Kiana Elliott – international weightlifter
 Sue Fear  – First Australian woman to climb Mount Everest (also attended Barker College)
 Dr Louise Holliday – Antarctic explorer, first Australian woman to be appointed to Davis Base
 Margaret Peden – Cricketer; former captain of the Australian women's cricket team (1934)
 Astrid Radjenovic – Australian Bobsled Winter Olympian

Business 
 Dr Sally Auld – chief economist at J.P. Morgan Australia and New Zealand
 Tara Commerford – vice president and managing director of GoDaddy Australia
 Liz Forsyth – deputy chairman and partner of KPMG
 Susan Lloyd-Hurwitz – CEO of Mirvac 
 Jill Ker Conway  – author, academic and businesswoman; past director and chairman, Lend Lease Group; director, Colgate-Palmolive and Nike; past director, Merrill Lynch
 Katie Rigg-Smith – CEO of Mindshare Australia, listed in B&T Magazine's Top Ten Most Influential Women in 2014 and 2015

See also

 Association of Heads of Independent Girls' Schools

References

External links
 Abbotsleigh website

Abbotsleigh
Abbotsleigh alumnae
Abbotsleigh Old Girls
Abbotsleigh alumnae
 *